The Sissiboo River is a river located in Digby County, Nova Scotia, Canada. The origins of the name "Sissiboo" are not known. The most credible is a derivation from the Mi'kmaq word for river, "Seboo."

The river flows out of a chain of lakes near the border with Annapolis County, named respectively, First, Second, Third, Fourth, Fifth, Sixth, Seventh, Eighth and Ninth Lakes.  The Sissiboo River follows a winding course, draining a large area and passing through the former lumbering communities of Weymouth Falls and Weymouth Mills.

The Sissiboo becomes tidal at Weymouth and its estuary is called Weymouth Harbour.  Trunk 1 crosses the river in Weymouth. An inactive Dominion Atlantic Railway bridge was demolished in 2012.  Further downstream, Highway 101 crosses near the fishing community of New Edinburgh.  The river empties into St. Mary's Bay.

The river currently is obstructed by four dams, three of which are used to generate hydroelectricity: Weymouth Falls, Sissiboo Falls and Fourth Lake.

See also
List of rivers of Nova Scotia

References

External links
Pictures of the river
Pictures of the DAR bridge, including demolition

Rivers of Nova Scotia
Landforms of Digby County, Nova Scotia